Estus Hood III (born November 14, 1955) is a former American football cornerback in the National Football League for the Green Bay Packers.  He played college football at Illinois State University.

References

1955 births
Living people
Sportspeople from Hattiesburg, Mississippi
American football cornerbacks
American football safeties
Illinois State Redbirds football players
Green Bay Packers players